Rhodoprasina corrigenda is a species of moth of the family Sphingidae. It is known from northern Thailand and northern Vietnam.

The wingspan is 104–116 mm. It is similar to Rhodoprasina corolla but larger and with a silvery sheen on the greenish forewings, which are longer and apically pointed. The hindwing has a pink area which is restricted to the basal half of the wing.

Adults are on wing from October to early December in Thailand.

References

Rhodoprasina
Moths described in 1996